Amal or el Amal or al Amal means (the) hope (أمل) or (the) work (عمل) in Arabic.

Amal, alAmal, elAmal, Alamal, Elamal, al-Amal, el-Amal, or variation, may refer to:

Buildings
 Al-Amal Club Stadium, a multiuse stadium in Al-Bukairiyah, Saudi Arabia
 Stade Al-Amal Atbara, a multiuse stadium in Atbarah, Sudan
 Complexe Al Amal, a tennis complex in Casablanca, Morocco
 Al Amal Private School-Aleppo or École Amal, K-12 private school in Aleppo, Syria

Businesses
 Alamal SC Atbara, a soccer team from Atbara, Sudan
 Al-Amal FC, a soccer team in Al-Bukayriyah, Saudi Arabia
 Farmacias El Amal, a pharmacy chain from Puerto Rico

Newspapers
 Al Amal (Lebanon), a newspaper from Beirut, Lebanon
 Al Amal (Tunisia), a newspaper from Tunisia
 Al-'Amal (Aden), a newspaper of the Aden Trade Union Congress from Aden, Yemen

Other uses
 Al-'Amal (Egyptian party), the Egyptian Islamic Labour Party
 Emirates Mars Mission, also called al Amal or Hope; a space probe

See also
 Amal (disambiguation)
 Al Amal (disambiguation)
 Hope (disambiguation)
 Work (disambiguation)
 Al (disambiguation)
 El (disambiguation)